TCM Movies (formerly Turner Classic Movies) is a British pay television channel featuring classic movies, mostly from the Turner Entertainment and Warner Bros. film libraries, which include many MGM titles.

History
It was launched in 1999, when its predecessor, TNT, dropped its film programming to become a general entertainment channel. Its penetration increased when it took over TNT's space on various platforms on 1 July 2000.

Unlike other versions of Turner Classic Movies and the other Turner channels in the UK, Turner Classic Movies UK was for a long time broadcast free-to-air. The channel became encrypted in January 2004 when it joined Sky's subscription packages.

In 2009, Turner Classic Movies received a graphical makeover and a new logo in an attempt to attract a younger audience. With the makeover several new films were added to the channel's catalogue. A high definition version of the channel launched on 4 September 2012, at the same time the standard definition version began broadcasting in 16:9 widescreen, whereas Turner Classic Movies 2 continued to be broadcast in 4:3.

On 2 March 2009, Turner Classic Movies UK sold the Sky EPG slot, when Travel Channel 2 closed.

A one-hour timeshift, Turner Classic Movies +1, launched on 13 August 2013, replacing Turner Classic Movies 2.

On 25 July 2019, the HD channel closed on Sky.

Turner Classic Movies was renamed TCM Movies on 1 August 2019.

Television series
 Band of Brothers
 Deadwood
 Gunsmoke
 Wild Boys
 The Pillars of the Earth
 Rome
 The Thorn Birds
 Hell on Wheels
 Ed Sullivan's Rock n'Roll Classics
 The Best of the Ed Sullivan Show

Turner Classic Movies 2
Turner Classic Movies 2 (TCM2) was a spin-off of the original channel. It also showed popular films from the Turner Entertainment library (which includes MGM and Warner Bros. films).

Films were shown from 8pm to 4am (interspersed with various original short films about the films) from Monday-Sunday, and the following week included a new line-up. This allowed the viewer to "catch-up on the big films", thus allowing the chance to see the preferred film on any day of the week. The channel timeshared with Cartoonito, another UK-only spin-off channel. The channel began airing Adult Swim at 10pm every Wednesday as of 4 January 2012, before moving to Friday later in April 2012.

For unknown reasons, Turner Classic Movies 2 closed at 4am on 12 August 2013 with Turner Classic Movies +1 launching the next day, 13 August 2013.

Adult Swim
As Adult Swim shows cannot be shown on the UK version of Cartoon Network (as Ofcom regulated children's channels are not allowed to broadcast adult content), they were shown on Turner Classic Movies 2 instead. They typically started at 1:15 AM on Saturday and included shows such as:

 Aqua Teen Hunger Force
 Robot Chicken
 Metalocalypse
 The Venture Bros.
 Tim and Eric Awesome Show, Great Job!
 Squidbillies

TNT UK

TNT UK was launched on 17 September 1993 along with Cartoon Network UK. The two channels shared the same transponder with Cartoon Network broadcasting during the day with TNT taking over for the evening and overnight period. Initially TNT was on air from 7pm until 5am although in 1996 TNT's start time was pushed back to 9pm. In the early years TNT was primarily a movie channel although the final year saw the channel move to a general entertainment schedule until TNT (UK) was replaced by Turner Classic Movies on 1 July 2000. Its old slogan was "Classic Movies".

World Championship Wrestling launched on TNT (UK) in April 1996 with WCW Monday Nitro. On 9 October 1998 WCW Thunder was added. Both aired in a 9pm to 12.30am (variant) block starting with the debut of Thunder. When TNT (UK) was closed down, WCW programming was briefly moved over to Turner Classic Movies and then Bravo. Trailers aired on Turner Classic Movies informing viewers of the change.

WCW Nitro
 1996 to 1997 - Friday Nights - 9pm - 10pm
 1997 to 1998 - Friday Nights - 9pm - 11pm
 1998 to 2000 - Friday Nights - 9pm - 11.35pm
 2000 - Friday Nights - 9pm - 11pm
(WCW Nitro then changed to Bravo in 2000, on Thursday Nights - 9pm - 11pm, until March 2001, when WCW was purchased by the World Wrestling Federation).

WCW Thunder
 9 October 1998 to 2000 - Friday Nights - 11.35pm - 1am

See also
 Turner Classic Movies

References

External links
 Official UK Site

Movie channels in the United Kingdom
Turner Broadcasting System UK & Ireland
Turner Classic Movies
Movie channels
Television channels and stations established in 1999
Classic television networks
1999 establishments in the United Kingdom